Germán Garrido (born 15 June 1948) is a member of one of Spain's most successful golfing families. His brother Antonio and nephew Ignacio were only the second father-son combination to have played in the Ryder Cup.

German Garrido turned professional in 1963. He played on the European circuit both before and after the establishment of the formal European Tour in 1972, winning the Madrid Open in 1968 and 1973 and the Portuguese Open in 1972. With his win in the 1973 Madrid Open, Garrido and his brother became the first pair of brothers to win on the European Tour. They were later followed by Manuel and Seve Ballesteros and Francesco and Edoardo Molinari.

Professional wins (3)

European Tour wins (1)

Other wins (2)
1968 Madrid Open
1972 Portuguese Open

External links

Spanish male golfers
European Tour golfers
Golfers from Madrid
1948 births
Living people
20th-century Spanish people
21st-century Spanish people